Lists of American writers include:

United States

By ethnicity
List of Asian American writers
List of American writers
List of American writers of Korean descent
List of African-American writers
List of Cuban American writers
List of Egyptian-American writers
List of Italian-American women writers
List of Jewish American writers
List of Mexican American writers
List of Puerto Rican writers
List of writers from peoples indigenous to the Americas (not limited to the U.S.)

By field
List of American literary critics
List of American print journalists
List of American novelists
List of playwrights from the United States
List of poets from the United States

By region
List of Michigan writers
List of San Francisco Bay Area writers
Utah writers

Other regions of the Americas
List of American expatriate writers
List of Central American writers
List of Latin American writers
List of writers from peoples indigenous to the Americas (not limited to the US)

Lists of lists of people